The men's 90 kg weightlifting competitions at the 1988 Summer Olympics in Seoul took place on 25 September at the Olympic Weightlifting Gymnasium. It was the tenth appearance of the middle heavyweight class.

Results

References

Weightlifting at the 1988 Summer Olympics